Tacna Ornamental Fountain, is a fountain located in Paseo Civico, the center of the city of Tacna, Peru.

History
It was acquired and given to the city of Tacna by the governor, Mr. ose Balta, in 1869.

Sculpture
The sculpture was given to Frances Paul Lien hard.
And it was forged in England by the Simpson foundry.
The first sculpted group, of a Classic style. 
It rises over a granite base which symbolizes the four seasons of the year and over the largest fountain.
The base is another group that represents four naked boys holding hands.

Architecture
It is six meters high and six meters in diameter.
And it is composed of various fountains.

References
Notes

 i perú(2014), "Información de Tacna".

Buildings and structures in Tacna Region
Fountains